Greatest Hits is a greatest hits album released by American rock band the Foo Fighters on November 3, 2009.

Release

Greatest Hits includes a selection of Foo Fighters hit singles. Two singles from their 1995 debut, Foo Fighters album ("This Is a Call" and "Big Me") are included. Three singles are included from 1997's The Colour and the Shape album ("Monkey Wrench", "Everlong" and "My Hero"). The Colour and the Shape remains the band's biggest selling album in the US. Two singles are included from 1999's There Is Nothing Left to Lose album ("Learn to Fly" and "Breakout") as are two singles from 2002's One by One album ("All My Life" and "Times Like These").  One single ("Best of You") is included from the band's biggest worldwide selling album In Your Honor, released in 2005. "Best of You" remains the band's highest-charting hit on the U.S., UK and Australian singles charts. Two singles are included from 2007's Echoes, Silence, Patience & Grace album ("The Pretender" and "Long Road to Ruin"). Greatest Hits also contains two new songs "Wheels" and "Word Forward".

"Wheels" is the first single taken from the album, which premiered on radio on September 23, 2009. The single was officially released on September 29, 2009. "Wheels" and "Word Forward", which was written for Dave Grohl's friend, Jimmy, who had recently died, were composed during the Echoes, Silence, Patience & Grace tour and recorded specifically for the compilation with producer Butch Vig.

A deluxe edition of the compilation includes a book and a DVD featuring some of the band's music videos and live performances. It also includes a video for "Wheels" directed by Sam Brown, who also worked on "The Pretender".

Release controversy
Dave Grohl has stated his displeasure with the release of a greatest hits album, stating he would have preferred to wait until after the band had retired. The band's label, however, had been wanting to release a compilation album for four years, and exercised a clause in the band's contract that allowed them to do so. Grohl has also mentioned that he felt that the album did not include some of the band's best work and that it was "like a CliffsNotes version of what we've been doing for the last 15 years". In the liner notes of the album, Grohl writes:

Reception

Reception was mostly positive for the compilation. Music critic Stephen Thomas Erlewine noted in his positive review that the compilation was missing some of the band's successful singles, most notably "DOA" and "I'll Stick Around". Matthew Perpetua of Pitchfork also noted the lack of "I'll Stick Around" on the compilation and suggested that the release would have been stronger with the inclusion of rarities and fan favorites, such as their cover of Prince's "Darling Nikki" or their popular soundtrack contribution "The One". Perpetua also writes "Like nearly all songs recorded specifically for [greatest hits compilations], 'Wheels' and 'Word Forward' are catchy but uninspired, and have no place among the heavy hitters in this collection." As of December 2015, it has sold 1,009,000 copies in the U.S.

Track listing

CD

DVD

At the main menu, there is bullet hole that you can click, and it shows Dave Grohl performing "Home" (from the album Echoes, Silence, Patience & Grace, 2007) on the piano.

Personnel
Dave Grohl – lead vocals, backing vocals, rhythm guitar , lead guitar , drums , bass 
Pat Smear – rhythm guitar 
Nate Mendel – bass 
Taylor Hawkins – drums except , backing vocals , lead vocals on "Have a Cigar"
Chris Shiflett – lead guitar , backing vocals

Charts

Weekly charts

Year-end charts

Decade-end charts

Certifications

References

External links

2009 greatest hits albums
Foo Fighters compilation albums
RCA Records compilation albums